Terpni is a small town in the Serres regional unit, Greece. Since the 2011 local government reform it is a municipal unit of the municipality of Visaltia, whose the seat is in Nigrita. It has a population of 2,169 inhabitants (2011 census) and until 1928 was named Tserpista.

History

Greek and Roman Antiquity
A few kilometers southwest of Terpni, on the hill named Palaiokastro, are preserved the ruins of an ancient settlement identified with the Roman waystation (mutatio)  Graero, known from the Roman itineraries.

From a Greek inscription of Roman imperial times, we are informed that this settlement had the size of a city (polis) with all its known architectural monuments (bouleuterion, gymnasium, etc.).

See also
List of settlements in the Serres regional unit

References

Populated places in Serres (regional unit)
Archaeological sites in Macedonia (Greece)
Geography of Macedonia (region)

Roman sites in Greece